Rupert Wagner is a German sprint canoer who competed in the mid-2000s. He won a silver medal in the K-2 1000 m event at the 2006 ICF Canoe Sprint World Championships in Szeged.

References

German male canoeists
Living people
Year of birth missing (living people)
ICF Canoe Sprint World Championships medalists in kayak